Ching San Yen Temple (also called as Chin San Yan Temple or Green Hill Temple) is a Buddhist temple located in a 2.5-acre site on a hill at 120 ft above sea level at the Sarawak River delta in Kuching, Sarawak, Malaysia.

History 
The temple had been existed on the hill since about 200 years ago, starting as a small temple. It was built by Chinese immigrants as a deep gratitude to Buddha Bodhisattvas and Mazu (Goddess of the Seas) for having guided, protected and blessed them on their dangerous journey where the location is selected based on geomancy selection following their safe arrival at the estuary of Sarawak River. The temple then become the source of fresh water to nearby village until 1980 when water supply being extended to the settlement. In 1903, the temple was renovated and enlarged.

Bodhisttva
Bodhisttva is a person in the Buddhist religion that stays behind in order to help all others reach nirvana before they themselves can attain it. They choose this life for themselves, even though they will never be able to attain nirvana.

Nirvana and Samsara
Nirvana can be described as complete nothingness. It is what all Buddhists strive to achieve in life. Samsara is the constant cycle of redeath and rebirth. This cycle is the process that leads to reaching nirvana.

References 

 

Chinese-Malaysian culture
Buddhist temples in Malaysia
Buildings and structures in Kuching
Tourist attractions in Sarawak